Tuin may refer to:

 Tuin (aerial lift), a type of hand-powered aerial lift traditional to the Himalaya
 Tuin, Iran, a village in Hamadan Province, Iran
 Tuin, Kičevo, a village in Kičevo municipality, Republic of Macedonia
 Tuin Island, an island featured in Lucy Irvine's book Castaway